Katy Backes Kozhimannil is an American public health researcher who is a professor at the University of Minnesota. Her research considers maternal mortality and the impacts of structural racism on community health. In 2020 she was awarded the 25th Annual Heinz Award in Public Policy.

Early life and education 
Kozhimannil studied Spanish and international relations at the University of Minnesota. She moved to Princeton University for her graduate studies, where she worked toward a Master of Public Administration (MPA) in policy and administration. Kozhimannil was a doctoral student at Harvard University, where she studied physics and mental maternal health services. She has said that she became interested in healthcare policy because of the loss of a family member, who was working on a rural Native American reservation when she died during childbirth, and after learning about the significant differences in the maternal mortality of people from different ethnicities.

Research and career 
Kozhimannil studies the health policies that impact healthcare, quality and outcomes during pregnancy and childbirth. In particular, she has evaluated the increasing rates of maternal mortality in marginalised communities in the United States. She has shown that women who live in less populated rural communities are 9% more likely to die during childbirth than those who live in cities.

Kozhimannil has also evaluated the role of Doula care during childbirth of women on Medicaid in Minnesota, and showed that they can decrease the chances of a caesarean section, result in better birth outcomes and save money.

Awards and honours 
 2015 Labelle Lectureship in Health Services Research
 2016 HCUP Outstanding Article of the Year Award
 2016 Alice S. Hersh New Investigator Award
 2018 Carol Weisman and Gary Chase Gender Based Award
 2020 Heinz Award for Public Policy

Selected publications

References 

University of Minnesota faculty
Princeton University alumni
Harvard University alumni
Public health researchers
Year of birth missing (living people)
Living people